Julie Zelingrová (born 28 March 2006) is a Czech curler.

At the national level, she is a one-time Czech mixed doubles champion curler (2022) and two-time Czech junior champion curler (2020, 2022).

Teams

Women's

Mixed

Mixed doubles

References

External links

Living people
2006 births
Sportspeople from Prague
Czech female curlers
Czech curling champions